Zarkorr! The Invader is an American 1996 direct-to-video monster movie directed by Michael Deak and Aaron Osborne and starring Franklin A. Vallette, Don Yanan, Peter Looney, Dyer McHenry, Rhys Pugh, Torie Lynch, Stan Chambers, and Elizabeth Anderson. It was produced by Full Moon Entertainment.

Plot
Intelligent aliens who have been studying Earth for centuries decide to challenge mankind by sending in a 185-foot, laser-eyed monster called Zarkorr to wreak city-crushing havoc. Only one incredibly average young man, postal worker Tommy Ward (Rhys Pugh), can find the beast's weakness and save the planet with the help of a 6-inch-tall pixie (Torie Lynch), who says she is "a mental image projected into his brain" by the aliens. She explains that Zarkorr cannot be destroyed by weapons, but that the key to the monster's destruction lies within the monster itself. Tommy, chosen as an average human, is the one destined to fight Zarkorr, who is programmed to kill him. Tommy asks scientist Dr. Stephanie Martin (De'Prise Grossman) for advice about his mission, but everyone thinks he is crazy. He takes the scientist hostage, but manages to explain his predicament to one of the policemen George Ray (Mark Hamilton), who believes him and helps him escape. Dr. Martin agrees to help him. Using computers belonging to a friend of hers, they establish that the monster, which is destroying city after city in the style of Godzilla, neither sleeps nor breathes. Going to the place where the monster first appeared, they come into possession of a strange metallic capsule that fell out of the sky at the time the monster arrived. It is believed to be unopenable, but it opens by itself for Tommy as he touches it. He uses the top of the capsule as a shield, reflecting Zarkorr's laser rays back at him, and the monster dissolves into a small glowing sphere flying into space. Tommy is taken to a hospital to recover; a TV reporter congratulates him for saving the world, and he jokes he might run for president.

Cast
 Rhys Pugh as Tommy Ward
 De'Prise Grossman as Dr. Stephanie Martin
 Mark Hamilton as George Ray
 Charles Schneider as Arthur
 Torie Lynch as Proctor
 Franklin A. Vallette as Horrace
 Don Yanan as Dunk
 Peter Looney as Billy
 Dyer McHenry as Al
 Stan Chambers as Stan
 Elizabeth Anderson as herself
 Robert Craighead as Marty Karlson
 Dileen Nesson as Debby Dalverson
 Mary Ostow as Reporter
 Jim Glassman as Stage Manager
 Emmett Grennan as Crew Member
 Mike Terner as Guard One
 Robert J. Ferrelli as Guard Two
 Ron Barnes as Larry Bates
 John Paul Fedele as Zarkorr

Production
The Zarkorr scenes directed by Michael Deak were filmed before Neal Marshall Stevens wrote the script. Principal photography took place over the course of less than a week. The effects for Zarkorr were created using a man in a rubber suit, similar to that of the Godzilla series. The costume was designed by Jodi Zimelman. The sound effect used for Zarkorr's roar is the same as the roar of the Tyrannosaurus rex from Jurassic Park.

Critical reception

Zarkorr! The Invader received negative reviews from critics, but has a cult following who tend to praise the monster Zarkorr, but not the movie as a whole.

Review aggregator Rotten Tomatoes reports that 13% of critics have given the film a positive review based out of 1 review, with an average rating of 1.3/5.

References

External links
 
 
 
 Zarkorr! The Invader at Badmovies.org
 Zarkorr! The Invader Official Facebook Page

1996 films
Giant monster films
American science fiction films
Alien invasions in films
1990s science fiction films
Full Moon Features films
Films scored by Richard Band
1990s English-language films
1990s American films